Edward Addison Gilbert (July 6, 1854 – March 13, 1935) (often referred to as "E.A. Gilbert") was a Nebraska politician who served as the ninth lieutenant governor of Nebraska from 1899 until 1901 under Governor William A. Poynter.  He also served as a Republican in the Nebraska legislature in 1889.  In 1900, he was nominated for a second term as lieutenant governor as a Silver Republican aligned with the Populists, and directly as a Populist in 1902 but did not prevail.

Gilbert was born in Illinois and moved from Macoupin County, Illinois to York County, Nebraska in 1884.  He married Louise May on January 1, 1878 in Carlinville, Illinois. He died in Long Beach, California on March 13, 1935 at the age of 80.

References

Lieutenant Governors of Nebraska
Nebraska Republicans
Nebraska Populists
1854 births
1935 deaths
Nebraska Silver Republicans